Tencent Video, also known as WeTV, is a popular Chinese video platform launched in 2011. A number of original programs developed by the company premiered in 2021.

Drama

Variety

References 

Tencent original programming
Lists of television series by streaming service